Neue Pizzicato Polka (German for "New Pizzicato-Polka"), Op. 449, is a polka composed by Johann Strauss II. It was written in 1892 for concerts to be given under Eduard Strauss in Hamburg. Strauss later inserted the work as a ballet between the second and third acts of his operetta  (Princess Ninetta).

The work is named Pizzicato Polka because the stringed instruments were plucked (pizzicato) throughout. There is also an old  which Johann Strauss composed in 1869 with his brother Josef.

References

Compositions by Johann Strauss II
1892 compositions
Polkas